Solidago riddellii, known as Riddell's goldenrod, is a North American plant species in the genus Solidago of the family Asteraceae. It grows primarily in the Great Lakes and eastern Great Plains of Canada and the United States. It is sometimes considered part of the genus Oligoneuron, but as a Solidago, included in the section Solidago sect. Ptarmicoidei, the flat-topped goldenrods.

Description
Solidago riddellii is a perennial herb up to 100 cm (40 inches) tall, with a branching underground caudex. One plant system can produce as many as ten stems. The leaves are long and narrow, up to 25 cm (10 inches) long, produced along the stems as well as at the base. One stem can sometimes produce as many as 450 small yellow flower heads, each with 7–9 ray florets surrounding 6–10 disc florets.

Distribution and habitat
Riddell's goldenrod is known from Alberta and Ontario, Canada. The core of its range in the United States is in prairie regions of Minnesota, Iowa, southern Wisconsin, northern Illinois and Indiana, southern Michigan, and Ohio. There are reports of isolated populations in Georgia, Arkansas, and southwestern South Dakota.

It grows in wet prairies and marshy areas.

References

External links
Photo of herbarium specimen at Missouri Botanical Garden, collected in Missouri in 1990

riddellii
Plants described in 1835
Flora of Canada
Flora of the Northeastern United States
Flora of the North-Central United States
Flora without expected TNC conservation status